Depressipoma is a genus of small sea snails with calcareous opercula, marine gastropod mollusks in the family Colloniidae.

Species
Species within the genus Depressipoma include:
 Depressipoma kwajaleina McLean, 2012
 Depressipoma laddi McLean, 2012

References

 McLean J.H. (2012) New species and genera of colloniids from Indo-Pacific coral reefs, with the definition of a new subfamily Liotipomatinae n. subfam. (Turbinoidea, Colloniidae). Zoosystema 34(2): 343-376

External links
 To World Register of Marine Species

Colloniidae
Gastropod genera